Yuncheng railway station is a railway station in Yanhu District, Yuncheng, Shanxi, China. It is an intermediate stop on the Datong–Puzhou railway.

See also
Yuncheng North railway station

References 

Railway stations in Shanxi